Mamta Joshi is an Indian Sufi singer from Chandigarh. She was awarded 'Ustad Bismillah Khan Yuva Puraskar' of Sangeet Natak Akademi (an autonomous body under the Ministry of Culture, Government of India) for the year 2015, for her notable talent in the field of Sufi and folk Music of Punjab. She is an assistant professor in Chandigarh.

She sings in Urdu, Punjabi, Hindi and other local languages. She performed live in her maiden US tour.

Albums
Amber De Taare
Asan Ishq Namaaz
Bhagat Singh
Ik Taara
Kamli De Saiyaan
Maahi
Naksha
Saifal Malooq

See also
 List of Sufi singers

References

External links
 

Indian women playback singers
Living people
Bollywood playback singers
Hindi-language singers
Year of birth missing (living people)